Mosnac may refer to the following places in France:

Mosnac, Charente, a commune in the department of Charente
Mosnac, Charente-Maritime, a commune in the department of Charente-Maritime